The Tale of Bygone Years, often known in English as the Rus' Primary Chronicle, the Russian Primary Chronicle, or simply the Primary Chronicle, as well as also, after the author it has traditionally been ascribed to, Nestor's Chronicle, is an Old East Slavic chronicle (letopis) of Kievan Rus' from about 850 to 1110, originally compiled in Kiev around 1113. 

The work’s name originates from the opening sentence of the text, which reads: “These are the narratives of bygone years regarding the origin of the land of Rus’ (Old East Slavic: Рѹсь), the first princes of Kyiv, and from what source the land of Rus’ had its beginning.” The work has long been considered to be a fundamental source in the interpretation of the history of the East Slavs. The Chronicle's content is known today from several surviving editions and codices that have been revised over the years and evince a slight degree of variation from each other.

The historical period covered in the Tale of Bygone Years begins with biblical times, in the introductory portion of the text, and concludes with the year 1117 in the Chronicle's third edition. Russian philologist and founder of the science of textology Aleksey Shakhmatov was the first one to discover early on that the chronology of the Primary Chronicle opens with an error. The Chronicle has it that “In the year 6360 (852), the fifteenth of the indiction, at the accession of the Emperor Michael, the land of Rus’ was first named.” 

However, 11th-century Greek historian John Skylitzes' accounts of the Byzantine history show that Emperor Michael III did not begin his reign in 852 but rather a decade earlier, on January 20, 842. Because of the work's several identified chronological issues and numerous logical incongruities that have been pointed out by historians over the years, the Chronicle's value as a reliable historical source has been placed under strict scrutiny by the contemporary experts in the field (see “”).

Authorship

First edition 
 
Tradition long regarded the original compilation as the work of a monk named Nestor (c. 1056 – c. 1114); hence scholars spoke of Nestor's Chronicle or of Nestor's manuscript. His compilation has not survived. Nestor worked at the court of Sviatopolk II of Kiev (ruled 1093–1113), and probably shared Sviatopolk's pro-Scandinavian policies. Nestor's likely Pan-Scandinavian attitude was confirmed by a Polish historian and archaeologist Wladyslaw Duczko (2004), who argued that one of the central aims of the Chronicle’s narrative is to “give an explanation how the Rurikids came to power in the lands of the Slavs, why the dynasty was the only legitimate one and why all the princes should terminate their internal fights and rule in peace and brotherly love.” The early part of the RPC features many anecdotal stories, among them:

 those of the arrival of the three Varangian brothers,
 the founding of Kyiv
 the murder of Askold and Dir, ca. 882
 the death of Oleg in 912, the "cause" of which was reported foreseen by him
 the thorough vengeance taken by Olga, the wife of Igor, on the Drevlians, who had murdered her husband; (Her actions secured Kievan Rus' from the Drevlians, preventing her from having to marry a Drevlian prince, and allowing her to act as regent until her young son came of age.)

The account of the labors of Saints Cyril and Methodius among the Slavic peoples also makes a very interesting tale, and to Nestor we owe the story of the summary way in which Vladimir the Great (ruled 980 to 1015) suppressed the worship of Perun and other traditional gods at Kyiv.

Second edition 
In the year 1116, Nestor's text was extensively edited by the hegumen Sylvester who appended his name at the end of the chronicle. As Vladimir Monomakh was the patron of the village of Vydubychi (now a neighborhood of Kyiv) where Sylvester's monastery was situated, the new edition glorified Vladimir and made him the central figure of later narrative. This second version of Nestor's work is preserved in the Laurentian codex (see ).

Third edition 
A third edition followed two years later and centered on the person of Vladimir's son and heir, Mstislav the Great. The author of this revision could have been Greek, for he corrected and updated much data on Byzantine affairs. This latest revision of Nestor's work is preserved in the Hypatian codex (see ).

Surviving manuscripts

Because the original of the chronicle as well as the earliest known copies are lost, it is difficult to establish the original content of the chronicle. The two main sources for the chronicle's text as it is known presently are the Laurentian Codex and the Hypatian Codex.

Laurentian Codex 
The Laurentian Codex was compiled in what are today Russian lands by the Nizhegorod monk Laurentius for the Prince Dmitry Konstantinovich in 1377. The original text he used was a codex (since lost) compiled for the Grand Duke Mikhail of Tver in 1305. The account continues until 1305, but the years 898–922, 1263–83 and 1288–94 are missing for reasons unknown. The manuscript was acquired by the famous Count Musin-Pushkin in 1792 and subsequently presented to the National Library of Russia in Saint Petersburg.

Hypatian Codex 
The Hypatian Codex dates to the 15th century. It was written in what are today Ukrainian lands and incorporates much information from the lost 12th-century Kievan Chronicle and 13th-century Galician–Volhynian Chronicle.  The language of this work is the East Slavic version of Church Slavonic language with many additional irregular east-slavisms (like other east-Slavic codices of the time). Whereas the Laurentian (Muscovite) text traces the Kievan legacy through to the Muscovite princes, the Hypatian text traces the Kievan legacy through the rulers of the Halych principality. The Hypatian codex was rediscovered in Kyiv in the 1620s, and a copy was made for Prince Kostiantyn Ostrozhsky. A copy was found in Russia in the 18th century at the Ipatiev Monastery of Kostroma by the Russian historian Nikolai Karamzin.

Numerous monographs and published versions of the chronicle have been made, the earliest known being in 1767. Aleksey Shakhmatov published a pioneering textological analysis of the narrative in 1908. Dmitry Likhachev and other Soviet scholars partly revisited his findings. Their versions attempted to reconstruct the pre-Nestorian chronicle, compiled at the court of Yaroslav the Wise in the mid-11th century.

Composition 
The organization style and the narrative flow of the Primary Chronicle exhibit visible signs of compilation, where different historical elements are brought together into a cohesive historical account. Studies by a Russian philologist Aleksey Shakhmatov and his followers have demonstrated that the RPC is indeed not a single literary work but an amalgamation of a number of preceding accounts and documents. In compiling the Chronicle, some of Nestor's original sources definitely included but were not limited to:

the earlier but now lost Slavonic chronicles
 the Byzantine annals of John Malalas, a Greek chronicler, who in 563 produced an 18 book work of intertwined myth and truth
 the Byzantine annals of George Hamartolus, a monk, who tried to adhere strictly to truth, and whose works are the unique contemporary source for the period 813–842
byliny,  which were traditional East Slavic oral epic narrative poems
Norse sagas
 several Greek religious texts
Rus'–Byzantine treaties
 oral accounts of Yan Vyshatich and of other military leaders.

Contents

Biblical origin 
The Primary Chronicle traces the history of the Slavic people all the way back to the times of Noah, whose three sons inherited the Earth:

 Shem inherited the eastern region: Persia, Bactria, Syria, Media, Babylon, Cordyna, Assyria, Mesopotamia, Arabia, Elymais, India, Coelesyria, Commagene, Phoenicia.
 Ham inherited the southern region: Egypt, Libya, Numidia, Massyris, Maurentania, Cilicia, Pamphylia, Mysia, Lycaonia, Phrygia, Camalia, Lycia. Caria, Lydia, Moesia, Troas, Aeolia, Bithynia, Sardinia, Crete, Cyprus.
 Japheth gained north-western territories: Armenia, Britain, Illyria, Dalmatia, Ionia, Macedonia, Media, Paphlagonia, Cappadocia, Scythia, and Thessaly.

The Varangians, the Swedes, the Normans, the Rus, and others were named to be descendants of Japheth. In the very beginning, humanity was united into a single nation, but after the fall of the Tower of Babel, the Slavic race was derived from the line of Japheth, “since they are the Noricians, who are identified with the Slavs.” Banks of the river Danube in the regions of Hungary, Illyria, and Bulgaria are then described to be the place of original settlement of the Slavic people.

Although, as a result of aggression on the part of the Vlachs, one group of the Slavs made their homes by the Vistula (Polyanians), another settled on the Dnieper (Drevlians and Polyanians), while the third resided along the Dvina (Dregovichians), and another group dwelt about the Lake Il’men. All this migration is dated back to the time of Andrew the Apostle who visited the Slavs on Il’men.

The Polyanians built Kyiv and named it after their ruler, Kyi. After the establishment of Kyiv, under the rulership of Emperor Heraclius, many of the Slavs were invaded and oppressed by the Bulgars, Avars, and Pechenegs. At the same time, the Slavs from the Dnieper came under the predatory lordship of the Khazars and were forced to pay tribute.

Chronology 
The chronology offered by the Primary Chronicle (PVL) is sometimes at odds with that of other documents such as the Novgorod First Chronicle (NPL) and Byzantine literature. Sometimes the Primary Chronicle also contradicts itself, especially between narrative and chronological parts, which appear to have been written by two different authors. Several scholars including Aleksey Shakhmatov (1897), Mikhail Tikhomirov (1960), Ia. S. Lur’e (1970), and Constantin Zuckerman (1995) have concluded that the 9th- and 10th-century dates mentioned in the PVL were not added to the text until the 11th century, unless directly copied from the Chronicle of George the Monk.
 
Chronology of major events:
 852 (6360): The principal date mentioned in the Chronicle, when the land of Rus’ was first named and when the Varangians first arrived at Tsargrad. It is claimed that the reign of Byzantine emperor Michael III began in this year, but Byzantine sources point out that it began on 21 January 842. Shakhmatov (1897) demonstrated that an editor based himself on a miscalculation found in the Short History of Nikephoros I of Constantinople. Moreover, a few sentences later, the text states: 'from the birth of Christ to Constantine, 318 years; and from Constantine to Michael, 542 years. Twenty-nine years passed between the first year of Michael's reign and the accession of Oleg, Prince of Rus'.' However, Constantine the Great acceded in 313, not 318, and the resulting sum of 318+542 years leads to another erroneous accession of Michael III, this time in 860. This then leads to an internal contradiction, when "Michael the Emperor" is said to have mounted a campaign against the Bulgars in 853–858 (6361–6366), which could not have happened before he became Byzantine emperor in 860 according to the latter accession date.
 859: Eastern Europe was divided amongst the Varangians and the Khazars. The former demanded tribute from the Slavs, the Krivichians, the Chuds, the Merians, and the Ves, while the latter imposed tribute upon the Polyanians, the Severians, and the Vyatichians.
 862: Invitation of the Varangians. The Slavs attempted to rid themselves of the Varangian lordship, which led to quarrels among the northern tribes and culminated in them inviting the Varangians to rule over them. As a result, the land of Rus’ was founded by three Varangian brothers: Rurik, Truvor, and Sineus. Shortly after, Rurik became the sole ruler of the realm and built Novgorod. At the same time, a Varangian state was established in Kyiv, with Askold and Dir at its head, that unprecedently posed a substantial threat to the Byzantine empire.
 866 (6374): The Siege of Constantinople (860) by Rus' forces. According to Byzantine sources, this happened in 860, not 866.
 881/2  (6390): Rurik's successor, Oleg, sent messengers to Askold and Dir, representing himself as a stranger on his way to Greece on an errand for Oleg and for Igor', the prince's son, requesting a meeting. He then ambushed Askold and Dir, saying: "You are not princes nor even of princely stock, but I am of princely birth." Igor' was then brought forward, and Oleg announced that he was the son of Rurik. They killed Askold and Dir, and after carrying them to the hill, they buried them there, on the hill now known as Uhorska (Hungarian hill), where the castle of Ol'ma now stands.' Then 'Oleg set himself up as prince in Kiev' 'and declared that it should be the mother of Rus' cities.' According to the text's aforementioned chronology of Oleg's accession 29 years after Michael III in 860, Oleg's reign should have begun in 889 rather than 881/2.
 883: Prince Oleg conquers the Derevlians.
 884–885: Prince Oleg defeats the Radimichians and the Severians, bringing them under his rule.
 907: Prince Oleg launched an incursion against the Greeks, resulting in a favorable treaty for Rus'. The Greek emperor Leo conceded to provide allowances for Oleg's men, award them a right to stay and trade in Constantinople free of tax, and to enter unconditional peace. This event is not mentioned in Byzantine sources.
 912: After Oleg's prophetic death from a snakebite, prince Igor succeeded him as the ruler of Rus' and was neither “successful in his military campaigns nor popular with people.” According to the Novgorod First Chronicle, Oleg died in 922; if Oleg (Helgi) is the same person as HLGW, "king of the Rus'", in the Genizah Letter, he would still have been alive in the 940s.
 Ca. 945: Prince Igor was murdered in the act of uprising by the Derevlians. His wife Olga assumed the throne following her husband's death and brought revenge upon Igor's murderers. Some of the Derevlians were burned in their homes, others were buried alive, while the remaining were simply slaughtered. Olga later ruled as a regent for her young son Svyatoslav, who went on to have an extensive military career as an adult, venturing East against the Khazars and the Bulgars.
 972:  Svyatoslav was killed in a Pecheneg ambush while returning from one of his frequent campaigns against the Greeks.
 973: The reign of Yaropolk began and was complicated by quarrels with his two brothers, Oleg and Vladimir.
 978–980: Yaropolk proved himself victorious against his brother Oleg but died at the hands of men of his other brother Vladimir. After inheriting the throne, Vladimir initially upheld pagan practices and worshipped Perun.
 988: Vladimir was baptized into Orthodoxy, which later became referred to as the baptism of Rus because it was followed by a widespread Christianization of Kievan Rus'.
 1015: Following Vladimir's death, Svyatopolk inherited the title of the Prince of Kyiv and became known as Svyatopolk the Accursed for his violent actions towards his siblings.
 1019: Svyatopolk was overthrown by his brother Yaroslav the Wise, whose reign brought an end to the unified kingdom of Rus but laid the foundation for the development of the written tradition in the Kievan Rus.
 1054: After Yaroslav's death, the kingdom was split into five princedoms with Izyaslav ruling in Kyiv, Svyatoslav in Chernigov, Igor in Vladimir, Vsevolod in Pereiaslav, and Rostislav in Tmutarakan’.
 1076: Vsevolod held a victory over his four rivals and became the Grand Prince of Kiev.
 1093: After Vsevolod’s death, Svyatopolk reigned over the Kievan Rus.
 1113: Rise to power of Vladimir Monomakh, whose religious testament and prayers were appended at the end of the Chronicle by monk Sylvester, working from St. Michael’s monastery in 1116.

Christianity in the Tale of Bygone Years 

The Rus' Primary Chronicle is vibrant with Christian themes and biblical allusions, which is often argued to be reflective of the text’s monastic authorship. Aleksandr Koptev remarked that despite its categorization as the Old East Slavic literature, the Chronicle also belongs to the genre of Christian literature. In the introduction, the chronicler was dedicated to exploring the biblical origin of the Slavic people, tracing their heritage to the times of Noah. In numerous occasions throughout the text, the chronicler openly discusses the pagan Slavs in a condescending manner, saying “for they were but pagans, and therefore ignorant.” Later in the Chronicle, one of the most pivotal moments of the narrative is Prince Vladimir's conversion to Orthodox Christianity which ignited extensive Christianization of the Kievan Rus.

Korsun legend 
According to the so-called "Korsun legend", presented in the Chronicle just preceding Vladimir's baptism, the Prince took possession of the Greek city of Korsun (Chersonesus) located in the Crimean Peninsula, in an attempt to gain certain benefits from Emperor Basil. Following Vladimir's successful conquest of the city, he demanded that the Emperor's 'unwedded' sister be given up for marriage with him. Upon hearing the news from Korsun, emperor Basil responded that "It is not meet for Christians to give in marriage to pagans. If you are baptized, you shall have her to wife, inherit the kingdom of God, and be our companion in faith." The legend concludes with Vladimir's embrace of Christianity at the church of St. Basil in Korsun and his marriage to the Emperor's sister, Anna Porphyrogenita.

Archaeological findings 
For centuries after the Chronicle’s creation, the legend's factuality had been subject to extensive debate. Many historians, antiquarians, and archaeologists had attempted to determine the actual location of Vladimir's conversion by synthesizing textual evidence of the Chronicle with material evidence from Crimea. Their efforts became known in the realms of historical discipline as the “archaeology of the Korsun legend.” This search culminated under Archbishop Innokentii's diocesan administration (1848–57), when in the ruins of Chersonesos, archaeologists unearthed the foundations of three churches and determined that the one containing the richest findings was allegedly used for the baptism of the Kievan Prince. The unearthed material evidence proved sufficient to pinpoint the real location of the legend's events with reasonable accuracy. 

In the early 1860s, the Eastern Orthodox Church began construction of The Saint Vladimir Cathedral in Chersonesos, which has been destroyed on three separate occasions after first being erected and was renovated each time thereafter. The cathedral last faced destruction during the October Revolution and was not restored until the fall of the Soviet Union. It has been argued that by honoring Vladimir the Great and his contribution to the Eastern Orthodoxy, the cathedral serves the purpose of validating Russia's historical ties with the Crimean Peninsula, the accounts of which are preserved by the Chronicle.

Assessment and critique
Unlike many other medieval chronicles written by European monks, the Tale of Bygone Years is unique as the only written testimony on the earliest history of East Slavic people.  Its comprehensive account of the history of Rus' is unmatched in other sources, but important correctives are provided by the Novgorod First Chronicle. It is also valuable as a prime example of the Old East Slavonic literature.

However, its reliability has been widely called into question and placed under careful examination by contemporary specialists in the field of the Old East Slavonic history. The first doubts about trustworthiness of the narratives were voiced by Nikolay Karamzin in his History of the Russian State (1816–26), which brought attention to Nestor's questionable chronology and style of prose. Building upon Karamzin's observations, further inquiries into the philology of the Rus Primary Chronicle shined more light on various weaknesses in the text's composition. According to Dmitry Likhachov (1950), the chronicle exhibits the presence of plentiful "fillers" that were added post factum and, in effect, "destroyed the narrative's logical progression."

Dmitry Likhachov famously wrote in his 1950 critique of the Rus Primary Chronicle, "No other country in the world is cloaked in such contradictory myths about its history as Russia, and no other nation in the world interprets its history as variously as do the Russian people." The need to interpret the Chronicle, mentioned by Likhachov as essential to making sense of its narrative, stems from the facts that the text was initially compiled and edited by multiple authors with different agendas and that it had to be translated from Old East Slavic language, which proved to be an arduous task.

Horace Lunt, a linguist from Harvard University, found it important to "admit freely that we are speculating" when the tales are reconstructed and the logical incongruities of the text are faced. According to Aleksey Shakhmatov, some of the incongruities are a direct result of the fact that "the ruling Princes of Kiev had their own propagandists who rewrote the annals to make political claims that best suited their own purposes." Shakhmatov further described the Tale of Bygone Years as a literary creation that fell under heavy influence of the Church and the State.

In the words of Wladyslaw Duczko, because of the multiple edits and revisions of the Chronicle, "information that was not compatible was left aside, while the elements that should be there but did not exist, were invented." Russian historian and author Igor Danilevsky mentioned that the Rus Primary Chronicle was more concerned with exploring the religious significance of the events rather than conveying to the reader the information about how it actually happened. As a result, a sizable portion of the text was directly borrowed from earlier works that contained a religious undertone like some Byzantine sources, and most notably, the Bible. The protagonists are frequently identified with biblical personages and so are ascribed certain relevant qualities and deeds that did not necessarily match the reality.

Ukrainian historian  in 2015 upheld the conclusion reached by his many predecessors that the Chronicle’s contents are more or less fictional. Tolochko argued that some of the tales, like the story of the Rurikid clan's entry into Kyiv, were invented "so as to produce a meaningful reconstruction of past events and include these well-known names" in the author's "historical scenario." Tolochko called the Rus Primary Chronicle an outstanding work of literature with an untrustworthy story and concluded that "there is absolutely no reason to continue basing our knowledge of the past on its content."

Paul Bushkovitch (2012) from Yale University writes “the author was serving his rulers, identifying princes and people and leaving historians with a muddle virtually impossible to sort out.” He also mentions that there are discrepancies when overlapping Scandinavian history with the narrative of the Primary Chronicle. For example, “archeological evidence does not fit the legends of the Primary Chronicle” such as: “in Scandinavia itself, there were no sagas of Viking triumphs and wars in Russia to match those recounting the conquest of Iceland and the British Isle’s”. The credibility of the Primary Chronicle should be taken with a grain of salt for its undertone of being a political tool to justify rule.

See also
 Academic Chronicle
 Freising manuscripts
 Ioachim Chronicle
 Izbornyk
 Nestor the Chronicler
 Russkaya Pravda

References

Further reading
 
 García de la Puente, Inés. 2006. “Single Combats in the PVL. An Indo-European Comparative Analysis”. In: Studi Slavistici 3 (1): 19-30. https://doi.org/10.13128/Studi_Slavis-2143.
 
 Velychenko, Stephen (1992). National history as cultural process: A survey of the interpretations of Ukraine's past in Polish, Russian, and Ukrainian historical writing from the earliest times to 1914. Edmonton. .
 Velychenko, Stephen (2007). "Nationalizing and Denationalizing the Past. Ukraine and Russia in Comparative Context". Ab Imperio (1).

External links

Transcription of original texts
 , from the Laurentian Codex
,  from the Hypatian Codex
, from the Novgorod Codex
 , includes an interlinear collation including the five main manuscript witnesses, as well as a new paradosis, or reconstruction of the original.

Translations 

 
 
 .
The Russian Primary Chronicle. Laurentian Text. Translated and edited by Samuel Hazzard Cross and Olgerd P. Sherbowitz-Wetzor.



1113 works
1110s books
12th-century history books
East Slavic chronicles
Old Church Slavonic literature
Christian literature
Slavic history